Ivaylo Georgiev Kalfin (born 30 May 1964) is a Bulgarian politician. A three-term deputy, he was Minister of Foreign Affairs of Bulgaria and Deputy Prime Minister from 2005 to 2009 in the Stanishev Cabinet. Kalfin was a Member of European Parliament between 2009 and 2014. Between 7 November 2014 and May 2016 he served as Deputy Prime-Minister of Bulgaria, and Minister of Labor and Social Policy in the Second Borisov Cabinet.

Biography 
Born in Sofia, Kalfin completed his high school studies in the Lycée Français de Sofia. He later received his higher education at the University of National and World Economy (1983–1988) and Loughborough University (1998–1999). His foreign language skills include English, French, Russian and Spanish. He is married and has a daughter.

Kalfin founded the Social Democrats National Movement and served as the deputy president of the Common Parliamentary Committee Bulgaria-European Union between 1995 and 1998. A deputy in the 37th (1994-1997), 38th (2000-2001) and 40th (since 2005) National Assembly of Bulgaria, Kalfin has been part of the Bulgarian National Bank's Consultative Council since 2004. He observed the elections in Kosovo in 2001 and 2004 as part of Organization for Security and Co-operation in Europe missions in the region and has also worked as a senior university lecturer and manager in several consulting companies.

Between 2002 and 2005, he was also an economic advisor to the President of Bulgaria, Georgi Parvanov. He became the Minister of Foreign Affairs and a Deputy Prime Minister in 2005. He is a member of Internet Society - Bulgaria.

Relations with the Republic of Macedonia 
On 24 July 2006, at the opening of a working conference with the heads of Bulgarian embassies and consulates abroad, Kalfin became the first Bulgarian Foreign Minister to publicly voice his opinion against the misinterpretation and misappropriation of the Bulgarian history by the Republic of Macedonia, saying that:

On 28 July 2006 Kalfin appealed to the Skopje authorities to replace the director of the Macedonian cultural and informational centre in Sofia Stefan Vlahov-Mitsov:

His statement was provoked by Mitsov's alleged participation in the management of UMO Ilinden-Pirin, a controversial party largely regarded as Macedonist and anti-Bulgarian by the Bulgarian public.

European Parliament 
In the European Parliament, Kalfin served as:
 Vice-chairman of the Committee on Budgets,
 Member of the Special Committee on the Financial, Economic and Social Crisis
 Member of the Delegation for relations with Albania, Bosnia and Herzegovina, Serbia, Montenegro and Kosovo
 Substitute at the Committee on Budgetary Control
 Substitute at the Committee on Industry, Research and Energy
 Substitute at the Delegation for relations with the countries of South Asia

See also

List of foreign ministers in 2009 
 Foreign relations of Bulgaria
List of Bulgarians

References

External links 

 Kalfin's biography at the European Parliament site
 

1964 births
Alumni of Loughborough University
Bulgarian Socialist Party politicians
Candidates for President of Bulgaria
Coalition for Bulgaria MEPs
Deputy prime ministers of Bulgaria
Foreign ministers of Bulgaria
Living people
Members of the National Assembly (Bulgaria)
MEPs for Bulgaria 2009–2014
Politicians from Sofia